McKissock is a surname. Notable people with the surname include:

Andrew McKissock (1873–1919), Australian politician
Dave McKissock, New Zealand footballer
Thomas McKissock (1790–1866), American politician
Wylie McKissock (1906–1994), English neurosurgeon

See also
McKissic